The Khumis, are a community inhabiting in the Chittagong Hill Tracts of Bangladesh. The Khumis are one of smallest ethnic groups in Bangladesh with a population of only 1214 according to the 1991 census (in the census of 1981 their population was recorded as 1258), though there are another 120,000 across the border in Burma.

History
Among the ethnic groups in Chittagong Hill Tracts the Khumis were the war like people. Earlier they were very often engaged in internecine or intertrinal warfare with the Bawms and the Mros. The Khumis used to live in Arakan; when there was fierce battle between them and the Mros, the latter being defeated fled to Chittagong Hill Tracts. But later the Khumis themselves entered Chittagong Hill Tracts after being defeated by a more powerful tribe.

Now the Khumis live in Ruma and Thanchi areas of Bandarban District.

Religion and culture
The Khumis are animists. The men keep long hair and tie it into a tuft on the head. They are dependent on shifting cultivation. Only in 1995 did one of their members passed Secondary School Certificate examination.

References

External links 

  An Ethnographic Study on the Khumi

Ethnic groups in Bangladesh